The 2018–19 Rhode Island Rams women's basketball team will represent the University of Rhode Island during the 2018–19 NCAA Division I women's basketball season. The Rams were led by fifth year head coach Daynia La-Force. The Rams were members of the Atlantic 10 Conference and play their home games at the Ryan Center. They finished the season 8–21, 3–13 in A-10 to finish in a tie for last place. They lost in the first round of the A-10 women's tournament to Duquesne.

On March 12, Daynia La-Force was fired. She finished at Rhode Island with an 5-year record of 46–102.

2018–19 media
All Rams home games and most conference road games that aren't televised will be shown on the A-10 Digital Network.

Roster

Schedule

|-
!colspan=9 style=| Exhibition

|-
!colspan=9 style=| Non-conference regular season

|-
!colspan=9 style=| Atlantic 10 regular season

|-
!colspan=9 style=| Atlantic 10 Women's Tournament

See also
 2018–19 Rhode Island Rams men's basketball team

References

Rhode Island Rams women's basketball seasons
Rhode Island
Rhode
Rhode